Chaudhry Muhammad Jameel is a Pakistani politician who had been a member of the Provincial Assembly of the Punjab from August 2018 till January 2023.

Political career

He was elected to the Provincial Assembly of the Punjab as a candidate of Pakistan Muslim League (N) from Constituency PP-240 (Bahawalnagar-IV) in 2018 Pakistani general election.

References

Living people
Pakistan Muslim League (N) MPAs (Punjab)
Year of birth missing (living people)